The 1902 UCI Track Cycling World Championships were the World Championship for track cycling. They took place in Rome, Italy for the sprint disciplines on 15 June and in Berlin, Germany for the motor paced disciplines on 22 June. Four events for men were contested, two for professionals and two for amateurs.

Medal summary

Medal table

References

Track cycling
Track cycling
UCI Track Cycling World Championships by year
International cycle races hosted by Germany
International cycle races hosted by Italy
Sports competitions in Rome
Sports competitions in Berlin
1902 in track cycling
June 1902 sports events
1900s in Rome
1900s in Berlin